Kion Benjamin (born 13 November 2000) is a Trinidad and Tobago athlete. He competed in the men's 4 × 100 metres relay event at the 2020 Summer Olympics. He won the 100 m bronze medal in the 2021 NACAC U23 Championships.

References

External links
 

2000 births
Living people
Trinidad and Tobago male sprinters
Athletes (track and field) at the 2020 Summer Olympics
Olympic athletes of Trinidad and Tobago
Place of birth missing (living people)
Athletes (track and field) at the 2022 Commonwealth Games
Commonwealth Games silver medallists for Trinidad and Tobago
Commonwealth Games medallists in athletics
Medallists at the 2022 Commonwealth Games